Itamar Marzel (איתמר מרזל; born May 16, 1949) is an Israeli former basketball player. He played the point guard position. He played in the Israeli Premier Basketball League, and for the Israel national basketball team.

Biography
Marzel was born in Israel, and grew up on Kibbutz Yagur. He is 1.85 m tall.

He played 13 seasons in the Israeli Premier Basketball League, for Hapoel Gilboa/Afula, Hapoel Haifa,  Hapoel Gvat, Hapoel Tel Aviv, and Hapoel Yagur. Marzel also played for the Israel national basketball team in the 1969 European Championship for Men, 1971 European Championship for Men, 1972 Pre-Olympic Basketball Tournament, 1973 European Championship for Men, 1975 European Championship for Men, 1976 European Olympic Qualifying Tournament for Men, 1977 European Championship for Men, and 1980 European Olympic Qualifying Tournament for Men.

References 

Living people
1949 births
People from Yagur
Israeli men's basketball players
Hapoel Tel Aviv B.C. players
Hapoel Haifa B.C. players
Hapoel Gilboa/Afula players
Israeli Basketball Premier League players
Basketball players at the 1970 Asian Games
Basketball players at the 1974 Asian Games
Medalists at the 1970 Asian Games
Medalists at the 1974 Asian Games
Asian Games medalists in basketball
Asian Games gold medalists for Israel
Asian Games silver medalists for Israel